Stadion pod Bijelim brijegom, also known as HŠK Zrinjski Stadium, is a City of Mostar owned association football stadium, located in the city of Mostar, Bosnia and Herzegovina. The venue is currently home of HŠK Zrinjski Mostar. Today it has a capacity of 9,000 seats.

Location
The stadium is situated in the city's center, in the neighborhood of Bijeli Brijeg, on the west bank of the Neretva river.

History
The stadium was built in 1958 with the public subsidies, and volunteering construction works by all denizens of Mostar, particularly students, and it served as the home ground of Velež Mostar during SFR Yugoslavia era. During the Bosnian War, between 1992 and 1995, and in particular subsequent incitement of Croat-Bosniak hostilities, the city of Mostar was effectively split to two parts, western (Croat) and eastern (Bosniak), divided around the river Neretva. The stadium sustained heavy damage during the war, while conflicting ideologies and interests were conveyed from the war times into the post-war era, evidenced in continuous and steady political divisiveness in the city of Mostar, among other, in issues of territorial and ownership disputes. Such political ambiance showed in the forced eviction of FK Velež Mostar from its traditional home-ground of stadium Pod Bijelim Brijegom, and subsequent political and public disputes over stadium usurpation by another club, emerging in the city at the beginning of the war in 1992, namely HŠK Zrinjski Mostar, one of three city's ethno-national football organizations banned by the former Yugoslav government immediately after the World War II. From that moment onward stadium serves solely as the home ground of Zrinjski Mostar. 

FK Velež Mostar used stadium Pod Bijelim Brijegom from the time it was built until 1992, through the club's glory days, when they emerged triumphant from their campaigns in the 1981 and 1986 Yugoslav Cups competition, and before that when the club also reached the quarter-final stage of the 1974–75 UEFA Cup. People around Velež Mostar club, supporters, as well as aficionados of this cult club around former Yugoslavia, public figures, including number of Croatian  intellectuals, continuously advocate for Velež's return to its original stadium, however, so far these calls fall on deaf ears with the city's administration, who often citing political and security issues to continue blocking of Velež's return. The club currently plays at the Rođeni Stadium which was built in 1995.

Importance
Bijeli Brijeg is the second largest stadium in Bosnia and Herzegovina, after Koševo stadium in Sarajevo. The club HŠK Zrinjski administration changed the stadium name into Stadion HŠK Zrinjski and registered it with the Football Federation of Bosnia and Herzegovina for the club's games under the association's auspices.

Gallery

References

External links

 

p
Football venues in Yugoslavia
Athletics (track and field) venues in Yugoslavia
Sports venues in Mostar
HŠK Zrinjski Mostar